The I.O.O.F. Hall in Woodbridge, California is a historic Odd Fellows hall and commercial block building that was built in 1861 and expanded in 1874 in Early Commercial architectural style.  It served historically as a clubhouse and as a business.  It was listed on the National Register of Historic Places in 1982.

It is a two-story brick rectangular block building.  Exterior detail on the building, believed to have been wooden, has been lost: an upper cornice, window heads, and a belt course between the two floors.  The date "1874" and the letters "I.O.O.F." remain.

It was built as a one-story brick building, the Lavinsky Store, in 1861, then expanded in 1874 to add a second story to accommodate the Odd Fellows' meeting hall.

References

Clubhouses on the National Register of Historic Places in California
Cultural infrastructure completed in 1861
Buildings and structures in San Joaquin County, California
Odd Fellows buildings in California
Buildings designated early commercial in the National Register of Historic Places
1861 establishments in California
National Register of Historic Places in San Joaquin County, California